P.W.A.: The Album... Keep It Poppin' is the fifth studio album by American hip hop group the 5th Ward Boyz. It was released on August 31, 1999 through Rap-A-Lot Records, making it their final record for the label. Production was handled by Derek "Grizz" Edwards, Mr. Lee and 5th Ward Boyz member E-Rock, with executive producers J Prince and OG Dewey. It features guest appearances from Devin the Dude, Ghetto Twiinz, Kuirshan, Outlawz, Rapsta, Willie D and Yukmouth. The album peaked at number 125 on the Billboard 200 and at number 26 on the Top R&B/Hip-Hop Albums in the United States.

Track listing

Charts

References

External links

1999 albums
5th Ward Boyz albums
Rap-A-Lot Records albums